John McGroarty may refer to:
 John S. McGroarty, poet, columnist and politician from California
 John McGroarty (New York politician)